Jonathan Trumbull Jr. (1740–1809) was a U.S. Senator from Connecticut from 1795 to 1796. Senator Trumbull may also refer to:

John H. Trumbull (1873–1961), Connecticut State Senate
Lyman Trumbull (1813–1896), U.S. Senator from Illinois